The 63rd General Assembly of Prince Edward Island is the 63rd sitting of the Legislative Assembly of Prince Edward Island and the 37th since confederation in 1873. The assembly was elected on May 28, 2007 with the result of a change of government and a landslide for Robert Ghiz and the Liberals.

Members
The Speaker of the Legislative Assembly (Kathleen Casey) is designated by a dagger.

 
 resigned August 30, 2007.
 resigned March 28, 2011.

Party standings

Membership changes

See also
List of Prince Edward Island General Assemblies

External links
The Legislative Assembly of Prince Edward Island, government website

Terms of the General Assembly of Prince Edward Island
2007 establishments in Prince Edward Island
21st century in Prince Edward Island